Galaxy 33 is a communications satellite owned by Intelsat located at 133° West longitude, serving the North American market. It was built by Northrop Grumman Innovation Systems, as part of its GEOStar-3 line. This satellite provides services in the C-band, Ku-band, and Ka-band.

Launch 
Galaxy 33 was launched aboard SpaceX’s Falcon 9 rocket from Cape Canaveral Space Force Station, Florida, United States on October 8, 2022.

References

External links 
  PDF

Communications satellites in geostationary orbit
Satellite television
Spacecraft launched in 2022
SpaceX commercial payloads